Janaratna is an emerging term for relationship-based business in India, similar to the term guanxi in Chinese.  Deriving from the Hindi words for people (jana) and precious stones (ratna), the term is interpreted to suggest the wealth resulting from relationships. Another interpretation of the term's origin is that people of high financial worth forming bonds leading to more wealth.

Description and Usage
The basic usage of janaratna is to indicate that a business deal came about as a result of a trusted relationship between people in a long-standing, and elite, network. The usage often carries connotations of corruption or cronyism (That highway deal is pure janaratna.), particularly involving politicians and wealthy entrepreneurs. It may also evoke a sense of exclusion from opportunity (No way I'm ever getting into that school, I'd need a lot more janaratna).

External links
Janaratna vs Guanxi, EMBA council 2014 Asia Meeting at Tsinghua University

Hindi words and phrases